Blücher is a 1988 Norwegian thriller film directed by Oddvar Bull Tuhus, starring Helge Jordal, Frank Krog and Hege Schøyen. Two North Sea divers who have recently been fired plan to vindicate themselves by a pioneer expedition to the wreckage of the German cruiser Blücher, at the bottom of the Oslofjord. The expedition soon becomes entangled in political intrigues.

Plot 
Two daring divers have recently been fired from their previous jobs in the North Sea, but want once and for all to demonstrate their superior skills as divers. Therefore, they are planning an expedition all the way down to the wreck of the German warship "Blücher", which was sunk outside Oscarsborg fortress on April 9, 1940.

However, unknown forces try to hinder the divers' mission. This is because there are papers on board, with information that can not stand the light of day.

External links
 
 Blücher at Filmweb.no (Norwegian)
 Blücher at the Norwegian Film Institute

1988 films
1988 thriller films
Norwegian thriller films
Films directed by Oddvar Bull Tuhus
Underwater action films